The 2022 IBSA Blind Football Asia/Oceania Championships is IBSA Blind Football Asian Championships' 9th edition for men, and 1st for women of the blind football tournament. The competition is being held at Kochi, India, will all matches being played at the United Sports Center between 9 November and 20 November 2022.

Men's tournament

Group A

Group B

Placement stage

9th-place placement match

5th/6th-place mini-tournament

''The IBSA decided to repeat the scorelines of matches which have been already played in the tournament, then, there was no rematch. South Korea were handed a 5-0 win against Uzbekistan, while India were handed a 0-0 draw with Malaysia.

Semi-finals

3rd-place match

Final

Top scorers

Women's tournament
It was played between two national teams in a two-legged final format.

References

External links 
 2022 IBSA Blind Football Asia/Oceania Championships
 https://www.blindfootball.in/asia-oceania-2022
 https://www.blindfootball.in/asia-oceania-2022-score-card
 https://blindfootball.sport/wp-content/uploads/2022/11/2022-IBSA-Blind-Football-Asia-Oceania-Championship-India-Final-Report.pdf

2022 in association football
2021–22 in Indian football
2022